Turion 64 is the name of a family of CPUs designed by AMD for the mobile computing market.

Features overview

Single-core mobile processors

Turion 64

"Lancaster" (90 nm)
 All models support: MMX, SSE, SSE2, SSE3, Enhanced 3DNow!, NX bit, AMD64, PowerNow!

"Richmond" (90 nm)
 All models support: MMX, SSE, SSE2, SSE3, Enhanced 3DNow!, NX bit, AMD64, PowerNow!, AMD-V

Sempron (Turion 64-based)

"Sable" (65 nm)
 All models support: MMX, SSE, SSE2, SSE3, Enhanced 3DNow!, NX bit, AMD64, PowerNow!

Athlon (Turion 64-based)

"Sable" (65 nm)
 All models support: MMX, SSE, SSE2, SSE3, Enhanced 3DNow!, NX bit, AMD64, PowerNow!, AMD-V

Sempron (Turion X2-based)

"Huron" (65 nm)
 All models support: MMX, SSE, SSE2, SSE3, Enhanced 3DNow!, NX bit, AMD64

Sempron (Turion II-based)

"Caspian" (45 nm)
 All models support: MMX, SSE, SSE2, SSE3, SSE4a, Enhanced 3DNow!, NX bit, AMD64, PowerNow!, AMD-VDual-core mobile processors

Turion 64 X2

"Taylor" (90 nm)
 All models support: MMX, SSE, SSE2, SSE3, Enhanced 3DNow!, NX bit, AMD64, PowerNow!, AMD-V"Trinidad" (90 nm)
 All models support: MMX, SSE, SSE2, SSE3, Enhanced 3DNow!, NX bit, AMD64, PowerNow!, AMD-V Athlon 64 X2 

"Tyler" (65 nm)
 All models support: MMX, SSE, SSE2, SSE3, Enhanced 3DNow!, NX bit, AMD64, PowerNow! Turion 64 X2 

"Tyler" (65 nm)
 All models support: MMX, SSE, SSE2, SSE3, Enhanced 3DNow!, NX bit, AMD64, PowerNow!, AMD-VTurion X2 / Turion X2 Ultra

"Lion" (65 nm)
 All models support: MMX, SSE, SSE2, SSE3, Enhanced 3DNow!, NX bit, AMD64, PowerNow!, AMD-V"Conesus" (65 nm)
 All models support: MMX, SSE, SSE2, SSE3, Enhanced 3DNow!, NX bit, AMD64, AMD-V Turion Neo X2 L625 supports AMD PowerNow! technology

Turion II / Turion II Ultra / Turion II Neo

"Caspian" (45 nm)
 All models support: MMX, SSE, SSE2, SSE3, SSE4a, Enhanced 3DNow!, NX bit, AMD64, PowerNow!, AMD-V All models are to be used with DDR2 memory (Socket S1g3 default design)

 "Champlain" (45 nm) 
 All models support: MMX, SSE, SSE2, SSE3, SSE4a, Enhanced 3DNow!, NX bit, AMD64, PowerNow!, AMD-V''
 All models are to be used with DDR3 memory (Socket S1g4 default design)

"Geneva" (45 nm)

Notes

See also
 AMD mobile platform
 List of AMD mobile microprocessors
 Table of AMD processors

References

Turion
Lists of microprocessors